Ranghar are a community of Muslim Rajputs in the Indian states of Haryana, Punjab, Himachal Pradesh, Delhi and Uttar Pradesh; and in Sindh (Muhajirs) and Punjab in Pakistan.

History and origin 
The Ranghar were classified as an "agricultural tribe" by the British Raj administration. This was often taken to be synonymous with the classification of martial race, and some Ranghars were recruited to the British Indian Army, especially in Skinner's Horse.

See also 
 Jhojha
 Garha

References 

 
Social groups of Pakistan
Punjabi tribes
Social groups of Himachal Pradesh
Social groups of Haryana
Muhajir communities
Social groups of Delhi
Muslim communities of Uttar Pradesh
Rajputs